Donald Macnish (June 10, 1841 – March 25, 1927) was an Ontario farmer and political figure. He represented Elgin West in the Legislative Assembly of Ontario from 1894 to 1899 as a Liberal-Patrons of Industry and then a Liberal member.

He was born in Argyleshire, Scotland and came to Canada West with his parents in 1852. He was educated in St. Thomas and lived near Fingal. He served as a school trustee. Macnish was an unsuccessful candidate for the federal seat in 1911.

External links 
The Canadian parliamentary companion, 1897 JA Gemmill

1841 births
1927 deaths
Ontario Liberal Party MPPs
People from Elgin County